A bronze sculpture of Elon Musk was unveiled in Lower Manhattan in 2021.
Since then, it has been removed.

References

2021 in New York City
2021 sculptures
Bronze sculptures in New York City
Elon Musk
Lower Manhattan
Monuments and memorials in New York City
Sculptures of men in New York City
Statues in New York City